The XVII Corps of the Ottoman Empire (Turkish: 17 nci Kolordu or On Yedinci Kolordu) was one of the corps of the Ottoman Army. It was formed during World War I.

Balkan Wars

Order of Battle, October 17, 1912 
On October 17, 1912, the corps was structured as follows:

XVII Provisional Corps (Thrace, under the command of the Eastern Army)
Samsun Redif Division, Eregli Redif Division, Smyrna Redif Division

Order of Battle, October 29, 1912 
On October 29, 1912, the corps was structured as follows:

XVII Provisional Corps (Thrace, under the command of the Second Eastern Army)
Samsun Redif Division, Eregli Redif Division, Trabzon Redif Division

On November 7, 1912, the XVII Provisional Corps was inactivated.

World War I

Order of Battle, 1915 
XVII Corps (Gallipoli)
15th Division, 25th Division

Order of Battle, 1917
XVII Corps (Smyrna)
None

After Mudros

Order of Battle, November 1918
In November 1918, the corps was structured as follows:

XVII Corps (Smyrna; present day: İzmir)
58th Division

Order of Battle, January 1919
In January 1919, the corps was structured as follows:

XVII Corps (Smyrna, Commander: Nureddin Pasha)
56th Division (Smyrna)
172nd Infantry Regiment, 173rd Infantry Regiment, 174th Infantry Regiment
57th Division (Aydın)
135th Infantry Regiment, 175th Infantry Regiment, 176th Infantry Regiment

Order of Battle, May 15, 1919

On May 15, 1919, the corps was structured as follows:

XVII Corps (Smyrna, Commander: Ali Nadir Pasha)
56th Division (Smyrna, Commander: Hürrem Bey)
172nd Infantry Regiment (Ayvalık, Commander: Ali Bey)
173rd Infantry Regiment (Urla, Commander: Kâzım Bey)
174th Infantry Regiment (Smyrna)
57th Division (Aydın, Commander: Şefik Bey)
135th Infantry Regiment, 175th Infantry Regiment, 176th Infantry Regiment

Sources

Corps of the Ottoman Empire
Military units and formations of the Ottoman Empire in World War I